Sanmenxian railway station is a railway station of Yongtaiwen Railway located in Sanmen County, Taizhou, Zhejiang, China.

Railway stations in Zhejiang